In computing, a syllable is a name for a platform-dependent unit of information storage. Depending on the target hardware, various bit widths (and sometimes internal groupings) are associated with it. Commonly used in the 1960s and 1970s, the term has mostly fallen into disuse in favour of terms like byte or word.

Examples:

 3-bit syllables: some experimental CISC designs
 8-bit syllables: English Electric KDF9 (represented as syllabic octals and also called slob-octals or slobs in this context) and Burroughs large systems (see also: Burroughs B6x00-7x00 instruction set)
 12-bit syllables: NCR computers such as the NCR 315 (also called slabs in this context) and Burroughs large systems
 13-bit syllables: Saturn Launch Vehicle Digital Computer (LVDC) and Gemini Spacecraft On-Board Computer (OBC)

See also
 Byte
 Catena (computing)
 Instruction syllable
 Nibble
 Opcode
 Opstring
 Parcel (computing)
 Syllable (in linguistics)
 Word (computer architecture)

References

Computing terminology
Data unit
Units of information